Ashamed is a 1950 Iranian drama film directed by Esmail Kushan.

Cast
 Abdullah Baghaie 
 Alexander Bijanian 
 Hossein Daneshavar 
 Delkash 
 Mohammad Ali Zarandi

References

Bibliography 
 Mohammad Ali Issari. Cinema in Iran, 1900-1979. Scarecrow Press, 1989.

External links 
 

1950 films
1950s Persian-language films
Films directed by Esmail Kushan
Iranian drama films
1950 drama films
Iranian black-and-white films